Henry Wellington Greatorex (1816 – September 1858) was an English-American musician.

Career
He was born in Burton upon Trent, England. He received a thorough musical education from his father, Thomas Greatorex, who was for many years organist of Westminster Abbey, and conductor of the London "concerts of ancient music." He came to the United States in 1839. In 1849, he married the artist Eliza Pratt. Prior to settling in New York City as a teacher of music and organist at Calvary Church, he played at churches in Hartford, Connecticut, including Center Church and St. John's Episcopal Church in the adjacent city of West Hartford, Connecticut.  Greatorex frequently sang in concerts and oratorios. For some years he was organist and conductor of the choir at St. Paul's chapel.

Greatorex did much to advance the standard of sacred music in the United States in the days when country singing-school teachers imposed their trivial melodies and the convivial measures of foreign composers on the texts of the hymn books at hand. He published a Collection of Psalm and Hymn Tunes, Chants, Anthems, and Sentences (Boston, 1851). One of Greatorex's best-known compositions is a setting of the Gloria Patri, widely used in Protestant denominations for the singing of the doxology in services to this day.

He died in Charleston, South Carolina.

Notes

References

External links

Free scores at the Mutopia Project

American male composers
People from Burton upon Trent
English emigrants to the United States
19th-century American composers
1816 births
1858 deaths
19th-century male musicians